Brian G. Ross (born c. 1946) is a Canadian curler.

Ross is originally from Arvida, Quebec. At the time of the 1977 Brier, he was working for Air Canada as a passenger agent.

Teams

References

External links
 
 Brian Ross – Curling Canada Stats Archive

Living people
Canadian male curlers
Curlers from Quebec
Brier champions
Date of birth missing (living people)
Place of birth missing (living people)
1940s births
Air Canada people
Sportspeople from Saguenay, Quebec